The TRAIL Research School is the Netherlands’ national (university) research school active in the fields of Transport, Infrastructure, and Logistics.

TRAIL provides education at Ph.D.-candidate level, initiates and conducts scientific and applied scientific research and organises activities for knowledge transfer and exchange.

Participants
Within TRAIL, Erasmus University of Rotterdam, Delft University of Technology, the University of Groningen, University of Twente and Radboud University Nijmegen collaborate.

Scientists and researchers of twelve faculties and institutes (spanning the fields of economics, technology, policy and management, and the social and behavioural sciences) form a concentration of experts in the fields of traffic and transport. Over 150 researchers, of whom 80 are PhD candidates, are active in TRAIL (2006).

Research programs
TRAIL initiates and participates in research programs, collaborative research arrangements with public and private parties, and other collaborative initiatives that aim to conduct (applied) scientific research and to bring research findings to concrete use and applications.

Accreditation
TRAIL was initiated in 1994; since 1997, TRAIL has been officially accredited by the Royal Netherlands Academy of Arts and Sciences as a formal Research School.

External links
TRAIL website
Database of TRAIL research projects (and others)

Education in the Netherlands
Transport in the Netherlands
Delft University of Technology
Erasmus University Rotterdam
Research institutes in the Netherlands